Kettrichhof transmitter is a facility for FM- and TV-broadcasting at Kettrichhof, a village which is part of Lemberg, Rhineland-Palatinate, Germany. It is located at an elevation of  a.s.l. Reception of its signals is possible in an area spanning from the Eifel to Karlsruhe and Pforzheim and even in elevated locations on the Swabian Alb. On 4 December 2007, the TV transmitter was switched over to DVB-T, and DAB+ transmissions from Kettrichhof started on 9 September 2015.

See also
 List of tallest structures in Germany

References

Radio masts and towers in Germany
1985 establishments in Germany
Towers completed in 1985
Buildings and structures in Südwestpfalz